Trichostetha (Greek 'hairy' + 'chest') is a genus of beetle in the scarab beetle family. It is endemic to southern Africa, and its species most commonly occur in mountainous terrain. The genus includes several species that have only recently been described, as well as many species lacking a description of any of the larval stages. Except for T. fascicularis and its subspecies, the species comprising Trichostetha have small ranges of distribution, frequently in the Cape Floral Region of South Africa.

Species and subspecies
The genus Trichostetha includes the following species and subspecies:
Trichostetha albopicta (Gory & Percheron, 1833)
Trichostetha barbertonensis Holm & Marais, 1988
Trichostetha bicolor Péringuey, 1907
Trichostetha calciventris Stobbia, 1995
Trichostetha capensis (Linnaeus, 1758)
Trichostema capensis capensis (Linnaeus, 1767)
Trichostema capensis hottentotta (Gory & Percheron, 1833)
Trichostema capensis oweni Allard, 1992
Trichostetha coetzeri Holm & Marais, 1988
Trichostetha curlei Perissinotto, Šípek & Ball, 2014
Trichostetha dukei Holm & Marais, 1988
Trichostetha fascicularis (Linnaeus, 1767)
Trichostetha fascicularis maraisi Stobbia, 1995
Trichostetha fascicularis natalis Burmeister, 1842
Trichostetha fascicularis nigripennis Allard, 1992
Trichostetha fascicularis prunipennis Burmeister, 1842
Trichostetha fuscorubra (Voet, 1779)
Trichostetha hawequas Holm & Perissinotto, 2004
Trichostetha mimetica Devecis, 1997 
Trichostetha potbergensis Holm & Perissinotto, 2004
Trichostetha signata (Fabricius, 1775)
Trichostema signata signata (Fabricius, 1775)
Trichostema signata tibialis Burmeister, 1842

References

Beetles of Africa
Insects of South Africa
Cetoniinae
Taxa named by Hermann Burmeister